The Bulstrode River is a tributary of Nicolet River, in Quebec, in Canada. From its source, this river flows north, north-west, then south-west, crossing ten municipalities:
 Les Appalaches Regional County Municipality (MRC), administrative region Chaudière-Appalaches: municipality of Saint-Fortunat;
 Arthabaska Regional County Municipality (MRC), administrative region Centre-du-Québec: municipality of Sainte-Hélène-de-Chester, Saint-Norbert-d'Arthabaska, Victoriaville, Saint-Valère, Saint-Samuel; and
 L'Érable Regional County Municipality (MRC), administrative region Centre-du-Québec: municipality of Sainte-Sophie-d'Halifax, Princeville.

The Bulstrode River sometimes flows in agricultural areas, sometimes in forest areas.

Geography 

The neighboring geographic slopes of the Bulstrode River are:
 north side: Bécancour River, Bourbon River, Noire River;
 south side: Nicolet River, Lachance River, Gosselin River;
 east side: Bécancour River, Larochelle River, rivière au Pin.

On its southerly course, the Bulstrode River flows into the Nicolet River at Saint-Samuel. The current crosses the Gaudet Reservoir in Victoriaville, from north to southwest, to the dam erected at the mouth.

Toponymy 

The term "Bulstrode" is linked to a river, a township, a street in Victoriaville, a municipality "Saint-Valère-de-Bulstrode" and a former name of a hamlet (today designated "hameau Defoy"). The Bulstrode River merges with Nicolet River west of Victoriaville. The river drains the waters of the municipalities of Saint-Valère, Saint-Samuel and Victoriaville. The Bulstrod River crosses the township of the same name.

Several hypotheses explain the origin of this name. This toponym evokes in particular the memory of the knight Richard Bulstrode (1610–1711), ambassador of England in the 17th century. He was the son of Edward Bulstrode (1588–1659), and spent his long life in the service of Charles I, Charles II, then James II. He also wrote memoirs which contributed to his popularity. The name of this river could also refer to a place designated "Bulstrode Park", in England, whose toponymic origin remains unclear.

The toponym "Bulstrode River" was made official on December 5, 1968, at the Place Names Bank of the Commission de toponymie du Québec.

Ecology 
In 1875, the Bulstrode River and the Nicolet River were recognized as one of the most noted streams for salmon, where he weighed an average of 18 to 24 pounds.

See also 

 List of rivers of Quebec

References 

Arthabaska Regional County Municipality
Rivers of Centre-du-Québec
Rivers of Chaudière-Appalaches
Les Appalaches Regional County Municipality